Jennifer L. Holm (born June 16, 1968) is an American children's writer, and recipient of three Newbery Honors and the Eisner Award.

Biography 
Holm was born in 1968 in San Diego, California. She spent her early life living on Whidbey Island on the Puget Sound in Washington state, before her family relocated to Audubon, Pennsylvania with her four brothers. She attended Methacton High School for four years. After graduating from Dickinson College in Carlisle, Pennsylvania, she worked in television and later began to write. Our Only May Amelia, the story of a 12-year-old girl living in late-19th century in coastal southwestern Washington state, inspired by a diary written by her great aunt, became her first published novel and was a 2000 Newbery Honor Book.  Holm also has written a series featuring Jane Peck, a young woman living in the 1850s (Boston Jane:  An Adventure, Boston Jane:  Wilderness Days and Boston Jane:  The Claim); The Creek, a horror thriller; Babymouse and Squish, series of graphic novels for children illustrated by her brother Matthew; and The Stink Files, a series co-written with her husband Jonathan Hamel featuring James Edward Bristlefur, a cat raised by a British secret agent who is adopted by an American family and renamed Mr. Stink after his owner is murdered. Penny from Heaven, a story set in the 1950s featuring an 11-year-old Italian-American girl, was a 2007 Newbery Honor recipient.  Turtle in Paradise, which is set in the Great Depression in Key West, Florida, was a 2011 Newbery Honor recipient. Babymouse for President won the 2013 Eisner Award for Best Publication for Early Readers (up to age 7).

Our Only May Amelia has been adapted for the stage by John Olive. The River Theater in Astoria, Oregon performed it for its 2006 summer run, in conjunction with FinnFest USA '06.  The events of the play (and book) were set just north of Astoria in Naselle, Washington.

Personal life
As of 2013, Holm lives in Foster City, California with her husband and two children.

Works

Standalone novels
The Creek (2003)
Penny from Heaven (2007) - Newbery Honor
The Lion of Mars (2021)

The Fourteenth Goldfish series
The Fourteenth Goldfish (2014)
The Third Mushroom (2018)

Sunny series
Graphic novels, illustrated by Matthew Holm and colored by Lark Pien
Sunny Side Up (2015)
Swing it, Sunny (2017)
Sunny Rolls the Dice (2019)
Sunny Makes a Splash (2021)

May Amelia series
Our Only May Amelia (1999) - Newbery Honor
The Trouble with May Amelia (2011), illustrated by Adam Gustavson

Our Only May Amelia can be found in the Newbery Great Girls Boxed Set (1999) along with three other Newbery Winners.

Boston Jane novel series
 Boston Jane: An Adventure (2001)
 Wilderness Days (2002)
 The Claim (2004)

Key West series
Turtle in Paradise (2010) - Newbery Honor
Full of Beans (2016) - a prequel from the perspective of Turtle's cousin, Beans.

Ginny Davis series
Illustrated by Elicit Castaldi
Middle School Is Worse Than Meatloaf: A Year Told Through Stuff (2007)
Eighth Grade is Making Me Sick: Ginny Davis's Year In Stuff (2012)

The Stink Files series
In collaboration with Jonathan Hamel, illustrated by Brad Weinman
The Stink Files, Dossier 001: The Postman Always Brings Mice (2004)
The Stink Files, Dossier 002: To Scratch a Thief (2004)
The Stink Files, Dossier 003: You Only Have Nine Lives (2005)

Babymouse series
Graphic novels, in collaboration with Matthew Holm
 Queen of the World! (2005)
 Our Hero (2005)
 Beach Babe (2006)
 Rock Star (2006)
 Heartbreaker (2006)
 Camp Babymouse (2007)
 Skater Girl (2007)
 Puppy Love (2007)
 Monster Mash (2008)
 Babymouse: The Musical (2009)
 Dragonslayer (2009)
 Babymouse Burns Rubber (2010)
 Cupcake Tycoon (2010)
 Mad Scientist (2011)
 A Very Babymouse Christmas (2011)
 Babymouse for President (2012) 
 Extreme Babymouse (2013) 
 Happy Birthday, Babymouse (2014)
 Bad Babysitter (2015)
 Babymouse Goes for the Gold (2016)

Compilations:
Babymouse Collection Books 1-13

Babymouse Tales From the Locker series
Illustrated by Matthew Holm
 Lights, Camera, Middle School! (July 4, 2017), 
 Miss Communication (July 24, 2018), 
 School-Tripped (July 29, 2019),

Little Babymouse
Picture book, illustrated by Matthew Holm
Little Babymouse and the Christmas Cupcakes (October 24, 2016),

Squish series
Graphic novels, in collaboration with Matthew Holm
 Squish: Super Ameoba (2011)
 Squish: Brave New Pond (2011)
 Squish: The Power Of The Parasite (2012)
 Squish: Captain Disaster (2012)
 Squish: Game On!  (2013)
 Squish: Fear the Amoeba   (2014)
 Squish: Deadly Disease of Doom (2015)
 Squish: Pod vs. Pod (2016)

My First Comics
Illustrated by Matthew Holm
I'm Grumpy (2016)
I'm Sunny (2016)
I'm Silly (2017)
I'm Scared (2017)

Comic book anthologies
 Comics Squad: Recess! (2014) Edited by Jennifer L. Holm
 "The Super-Secret Ninja Club" by Gene Luen Yang
 "Book 'Em, Dog Man!" by Dav Pilkey
 "Betty and the Perilous Pizza Day" by Jarrett J. Krosoczka
 "The Magic Acorn" by Ursula Vernon
 "Babymouse: The Quest for Recess" by Jennifer L. Holm and Matthew Holm
 "Jiminy Sprinkles in 'Freeze Tag'" by Eric Wight
 "300 Words" by Dan Santat
 "The Rainy Day Monitor" by Raina Telgemeier and Dave Roman
 Comics Squad #2: Lunch! (2016) Edited by Jennifer L. Holm and Matthew Holm
 "Crazy Little Thing Called Lunch!" by Cece Bell
 "Snoopy in...Lunchtime Beagle" by Peanuts
 "Babymouse: Lunch Table Champion" by Jennifer L. Holm and Matthew Holm
 "The Case of the Missing Science Project" by Jason Shiga
 "Pikput & Cullen in...Worst Day Ever!" by Cecil Castellucci and Sara Varon
 "Lucy & Andy Neanderthal: Cave Soup" by Jeffrey Brown
 "Lunch Bomb 1943" by Nathan Hale
 "Lunch Girl and the Ominous Origin" by Jarrett J. Krosoczka
 Comics Squad #3: Detention! (2017) Edited by Jennifer L. Holm, Matthew Holm, and Jarrett J. Krosoczka

Anthology contributions
 Shelf Life: Stories by the Book (2003), edited by Gary Paulson
 Contains "Follow the Water" by Jennifer L. Holm
 Friends: Stories about New Friends, Old Friends, and Unexpectedly True Friends (2005)
 Contains "My Best Friend" by Jennifer L. Holm

Book introductions
 Anne of Avonlea by L. M. Montgomery (originally published 1909) - Introduction
 Too Much Information by Gene Ambaum and Bill Barnes (2012) - Foreword

Selected awards and honors
 Newbery Honor Awards
 2000 for Our Only May Amelia
 2007 for Penny from Heaven
 2011 for Turtle in Paradise
 2011 Golden Kite Award for Turtle in Paradise 2013 Eisner Award for Best Publication for Early Readers for Babymouse for President2014 California Book Awards Gold Medal Juvenile winner for The Fourteenth Goldfish 
 2015 E. B. White Read Aloud Award for The Fourteenth Goldfish''

Notes

References

External links

 
 Babymouse series (official)
 Squish series (official)
 Stink Files series (official)
 
 Audio Interview (MP3), December 2007
 Interview by Miss Erin, January 2007

Living people
1968 births
20th-century American novelists
20th-century American women writers
21st-century American novelists
21st-century American women writers
American children's writers
American historical novelists
American women children's writers
American women novelists
Dickinson College alumni
Newbery Honor winners
Place of birth missing (living people)
Women historical novelists